"Sooner or Later" is a 1971 hit song by The Grass Roots. It was released as a single and put on their third compilation album, Their 16 Greatest Hits. It reached number 9 on the US Billboard Hot 100, becoming their third and last top ten hit.

The single tells about a girl the narrator is in love with, but it's not mutual, because of her past experiences with love. He says that "sooner or later" she will succumb to love and give in to him.

Bassist and usual lead singer Rob Grill shared lead vocals with keyboardist Dennis Provisor. Excluding Provisor's organ, most of the instrumental backing were made by the Wrecking Crew.

Chart performance

Weekly charts

Year-end charts

GF4 version 

Australian group GF4, formerly known as Girlfriend, released a cover version as a single in October 1994. The single peaked at number 11 on the ARIA Charts.

Track listing

Charts

References

External links 
 

1971 singles
The Grass Roots songs
ABC Records singles
Dunhill Records singles
1971 songs
Songs written by Gary Zekley
1994 singles
Bertelsmann Music Group singles
Girlfriend (band) songs